The Electric Horseman: Music from the Original Motion Picture Soundtrack is the soundtrack to the Sydney Pollack film The Electric Horseman.

Track listing

Side one
Songs by Willie Nelson
"Midnight Rider" – 2:51
"My Heroes Have Always Been Cowboys" – 3:05
"Mammas Don't Let Your Babies Grow Up to Be Cowboys" – 3:28
"So You Think You're a Cowboy" – 2:19
"Hands on the Wheel" – 2:50

Side two
Film score by Dave Grusin
"Electro-Phantasma" – 5:00
"Rising Star (Love Theme)" – 2:36
"The Electric Horseman" – 3:41
"Interlude-Tumbleweed Morning" – 0:29
"Disco Magic" – 5:03
"Freedom Epilogue" – 2:11

Personnel
Willie Nelson – Guitar, vocals, performer
Dave Grusin – Performer

1979 soundtrack albums
Willie Nelson soundtracks
Columbia Records soundtracks
Comedy film soundtracks
Drama film soundtracks
Romance film soundtracks
Western film soundtracks